Fjæra Chapel is a parish church of the Church of Norway in Etne Municipality in Vestland county, Norway. It is located in the village of Fjæra at the innermost end of the Åkrafjorden. It is one of the churches for the Skånevik parish which is part of the Sunnhordland prosti (deanery) in the Diocese of Bjørgvin. The white, wooden church was built in a long church design in 1913 using plans drawn up by the architect Hartvig Sverdrup Eckhoff. The church seats about 150 people.

History
The chapel was built in 1912-1913 to serve the people living around the inner part of the Åkrafjorden. It has a nave with a choir and sacristy on the east end and a church porch with a tower above on the west end. The church was restored and renovated in 1968. In 1973, a small bathroom building was constructed right next to the chapel.

See also
List of churches in Bjørgvin

References

Etne
Churches in Vestland
Long churches in Norway
Wooden churches in Norway
20th-century Church of Norway church buildings
Churches completed in 1913
1913 establishments in Norway